Tang Qi (born 20 October 1986) is a Chinese male track cyclist. He competed at the 2007, 2011 and 2012 UCI Track Cycling World Championships.

References

External links
 
 

1986 births
Living people
Chinese track cyclists
Chinese male cyclists
Place of birth missing (living people)
Asian Games medalists in cycling
Cyclists at the 2006 Asian Games
Medalists at the 2006 Asian Games
Asian Games bronze medalists for China